This article presents a list of the historical events and publications of Australian literature during 1871.

Books 

 Louisa Atkinson — Tom Hellicar's Children
 Mary Anne Broome
 A Christmas Cake in Four Quarters
 Spring Comedies
 Charles de Boos — Mark Brown's Wife : A Tale of the Gold-Fields
 Mary Fortune — The Bushranger's Autobiography

Short stories 

 Marcus Clarke — Old Tales of a Young Country (edited)
 Mary Fortune — The Detective's Album : Tales of the Australian Police
 Henry Kingsley — Hetty and Other Stories

Poetry 

 Mary Fortune — "Conjuro Te"
 J. Brunton Stephens — "Convict Once"

Essays 

 Henry Kendall — "A Colonial Literary Club"

Births 

A list, ordered by date of birth (and, if the date is either unspecified or repeated, ordered alphabetically by surname) of births in 1871 of Australian literary figures, authors of written works or literature-related individuals follows, including year of death.

 24 January — Oscar Asche, playwright and novelist (died 1936)
 18 July — Percival Serle, biographer and bibliographer (died 1951)
 2 September — John Le Gay Brereton, poet (died 1933)
 21 October — Louis Stone, novelist (died 1935)

See also 
 1871 in Australia
 1871 in literature
 1871 in poetry
 List of years in Australian literature
 List of years in literature

References

 
Australia
19th-century Australian literature
Australian literature by year